Indestructible Man is a 1956 American crime horror science fiction film, an original screenplay by Vy Russell and Sue Dwiggins for producer-director Jack Pollexfen and starring Lon Chaney Jr., Ross Elliott and Robert Shayne.

The picture was produced independently by C.G.K. Productions, and distributed in the United States by Allied Artists Pictures Corporation. The film was distributed theatrically in 1956 on a double bill with World Without End (and in some areas with Invasion of the Body Snatchers).

Plot 
Told in a narrative style, popularized by the television police series Dragnet, by police detective Dick Chasen, the story concerns a 72-hour period of horror for the city of Los Angeles. Charles "Butcher" Benton is a double-crossed convicted robber and murderer who was executed in the gas chamber. His body is unlawfully sold to a scientist who plans to move his experiments into the cause and cure of cancer to human subjects. Benton's corpse is subjected to chemical injection and massive jolts of high-voltage electricity in order to study the effect on human tissues. But Benton's heart is re-stimulated and he completely revives (though rendered mute due to electrical damage to his vocal cords), immensely strong and with skin virtually impervious to scalpels, police bullets, even to bazooka shells.

After killing the doctor and his assistant, Benton sets out to avenge himself on his two henchmen and his attorney, Paul Lowe who, in collusion with the henchmen, had betrayed Benton in order to steal his loot. Benton had left the location of his stash to his stripper-girlfriend , who had since gone straight and begun dating the detective who brought Benton to justice, after she had rejected the lawyer's own advances.

The story then follows Benton's revenge on his enemies; the police who first learn of a wave of mysterious killings, then of Benton's reanimation; and the developing relationship between the detective and the stripper. The lawyer, Lowe, fearing for his life after the two henchmen are murdered, confesses the plot to the police, and reveals that Benton had always used the sewer system to evade detection; and to find a hiding place for the money, as it turns out.

Tracked down by the police, Benton takes a direct hit in the solar plexus from a bazooka, and is heavily burned by a flame thrower. Weakened, he flees to a power station, where he climbs atop a gantry, inadvertently setting it in motion.  As he watches the actions of the police down below, he fails to notice that the gantry is moving toward the main transformer.  A dangling hook comes too close to one of the terminals, and the other transformers erupt in sparks. as hundreds of thousands of volts surge throughout its metal frame, searing Benton to ashes. On a quiet night a few days later, Chasen successfully proposes to his girlfriend.

Personnel

Cast

Starring:
 Lon Chaney, Jr. as Charles "Butcher" Benton
 Max Showalter as Lt. Richard Chasen
 Marian Carr as Eva Martin
 Ross Elliott as Paul Lowe

Featuring:
 Stuart Randall as Capt. John Lauder
 Marvin Press* as Henchman "Squeamy" Ellis
 Ken Terrell as Henchman Joe Marcelli
 Roy Engel as the Desk Sergeant
 Robert Foulk as Harry the Bartender
 Robert Shayne as Dr. Bradshaw
 Joe Flynn as Bradshaw's Assistant (uncredited)
 Peggy Maley as Francine, a stripper
 Marjorie Bennett as Floozie at Bar

* Marvin Press was misidentified as Marvin Ellis (the last name of his character) in all the film's publicity.  Worse, his name was entirely omitted from the screen cast list.

Crew

 Ted Holsopple as Art Director
 John Russell, Jr. as Director of Photography
 Fred Feitshans, Jr. as Film Editor
 Albert Glasser as "Music"
 Chris Beute as Production Manager

Production background

 Chaney has almost no dialogue in the film. His character's emotions were shown through extreme close-ups of his face.
 Angels Flight appears prominently in this film.
 The Bradbury Building interior is featured prominently in this film.

Production stills exist of scenes not in the film as released. One shows "Butcher" Benton at a jail where a policeman's body lies on the ground as Benton carries off Eva Martin. The scene logically came after the police threatened to release Paul Lowe from custody if he does not reveal the location of Benton's loot, and before the scene where it is revealed Eva has checked herself out of a hospital, presumably after recovering from unspecified injuries. Presumably, this scene is where Benton made good on his threat to get Paul Lowe, breaking into the jail to do it.

Although Joe Flynn played a serious role in this film, he later specialized in comedic roles, most memorably as the irascible Captain Binghamton on TV's McHale's Navy (1962–66).

Bibliography
The full story of the making of the movie (complete with interviews with some of the participants) plus the script and pressbook are featured in the book Scripts from the Crypt: 'Indestructible Man'  (BearManor, 2015) by Tom Weaver.

In popular culture
 John Darnielle of the Mountain Goats wrote and performed "Rotten Stinking Mouthpiece", referencing a line spoken by Chaney's character to his double-crossing lawyer.
 The 2003 Thom Andersen film essay Los Angeles Plays Itself featured clips from the film.

Home media
The film has been released by numerous studios as a "bargain bin" disc.  In addition, the MST3K version of the film has been released by Rhino Home Video as part of the Collection Volume 11 box set which was soon to be re-released by Shout Factory in 2019.

See also
 List of American films of 1956
 List of films in the public domain in the United States

References

External links

 
 
 
 
 
 MST3K take of the film on ShoutFactoryTV

1956 films
American science fiction horror films
1950s English-language films
American black-and-white films
American independent films
1950s science fiction horror films
1956 horror films
American monster movies
Films scored by Albert Glasser
Allied Artists films
1950s monster movies
Articles containing video clips
1950s independent films
1950s American films